BrainBuzz is an Australian children's show on 9Go! from 19 February 2018, starring Kellyn Morris, scientist Clare Van Dorssen and "Einstein", played by Michael Balk. The series involves children who explore, dissect and solve many of the world's frequently asked questions and has been described as "science by stealth". The program is filmed at the QTQ Studio in Brisbane, Australia.

Series overview

References

External links
 

9Go! original programming
Australian children's television series
2018 Australian television series debuts 
2020 Australian television series endings
Television shows set in Brisbane
English-language television shows